Edgar Tornez (born 4 September 1954) is a Guatemalan weightlifter. He competed in the men's bantamweight event at the 1976 Summer Olympics.

References

1954 births
Living people
Guatemalan male weightlifters
Olympic weightlifters of Guatemala
Weightlifters at the 1976 Summer Olympics
Place of birth missing (living people)
20th-century Guatemalan people